Professor is a 1962 Hindi film, produced by F. C. Mehra and directed by Lekh Tandon. The film stars Shammi Kapoor, Kalpana, Bela Bose, Lalita Pawar, Tun Tun and Iftekhar. The film's music is by Shankar Jaikishan.  The film became a box office hit. The film was remade in Tamil as Nadigan (1990), in Telugu twice as Bhale Mastaru (1969), Peddinti Alludu (1991) and in Kannada as Gopi Krishna  The rights to this film are owned by Shah Rukh Khan's Red Chillies Entertainment.

Plot
Sita Devi Verma (Lalita Pawar), situated in Darjeeling is the guardian to two young women (Nina and Rita) and two school children (Bunty and Munnu) in her care. She is a strict guardian and the four often disobey her and create mischief behind her back. She is looking for a professor as a tutor, her only condition being that he should be above 50 years of age. Pritam Khanna (Shammi Kapoor), a young college graduate in dire need of work, applies for the job and get dejected after being rejected due to his age. The same day, he discovers his mother (Pratima Devi) has an advanced stage of tuberculosis and needs hospitalization. Due to financial difficulties, he disguises himself as an older professor and takes the job.

The women do not want a professor and try every trick in the book to defame the professor in the eyes of Sita Devi. Pritam soon catches on and defeats them at their own game. He falls in love with Nina and woos her as a young man in the city. Chaos ensues when Sita Devi develops feelings towards old Prof. Khanna and Pritam has to romance the two ladies in different disguises at the same time.

Cast
Initially Dev Anand and Raj Kapoor were approached for the lead role of Pritam but they did not accept.

 Shammi Kapoor...Professor Pritam Khanna
 Kalpana...Neena 
 Randhir (actor)....Professor sahab
 Salim Khan...Ramesh
Verma
 Lalita Pawar...Sita Devi Verma
 Parveen Choudhary...Rita Verma
 Pratima Devi...as Pritam mom 
 Rashid Khan...Hanuman Singh
 Bela Bose...Hanuman Singh's daughter
 Tun Tun...Phool Rani
  Amol Sen... as Tun Tun Lover,boyfriend
 Iftekhar...Artist
 Bir Sakuja...Ramesh's father
Moolchand...Jeweller
 Ratan Gaurang...Hotel boy Chang
 Maqsood...Hotel waiter
 Ratnamala...Sita Devi's friend from tribal village
 Gopal 
 M.A. Latif...Doctor treating Rita Verma

Soundtrack

All the songs were composed by Shankar–Jaikishan, assisted by Dattaram Wadkar.

Awards and nominations
Won: Filmfare Best Music Director Award - Shankar Jaikishan
Nominated: Filmfare Award for Best Actor - Shammi Kapoor
Nominated: Filmfare Award for Best Supporting Actress - Lalita Pawar
Nominated: Filmfare Award for Best Lyricist - Hasrat Jaipuri for the song "Aai Gulbadan"
Nominated: Filmfare Award for Best Male Playback Singer - Mohammed Rafi for the song "Aye Gulbadan"

References

External links

1962 films
1960s Hindi-language films
Films directed by Lekh Tandon
Films scored by Shankar–Jaikishan
Hindi films remade in other languages
Indian comedy films
1962 comedy films
Hindi-language comedy films